

Biography 
Jorge Salas (born 27 August 1942) is an Argentine biathlete. He competed from 1977 until 1981 in the world championship relay and individual.

He is now Miembro Ejecutivo- Executive Board Member en Union.

Biathlon Results

References

1942 births
Living people
Argentine male biathletes
Olympic biathletes of Argentina
Biathletes at the 1980 Winter Olympics
Place of birth missing (living people)